Espenberg is a settlement in the U.S. state of Alaska, located  northwest of Deering on the Seward Peninsula at the mouth of the Espenberg River by the Chukchi Sea. It lies within the Northwest Arctic Borough, consisting of a site with five or six buildings. The name is derived from nearby Cape Espenberg.

References

Populated places in the Seward Peninsula
Chukchi Sea
Populated coastal places in Alaska on the Arctic Ocean